Douglas Blackwell (17 May 1924 – 17 October 2009) was an English actor. Douglas Blackwell was born in Gloucester, Gloucestershire, England, but brought up in Port Talbot, Wales, where he attended the local county grammar school. He narrated the 1990s Mr Men audio cassettes. His television appearances included roles in Softly, Softly, The Avengers, Z-Cars, The 10th Kingdom and Dixon of Dock Green. He also appeared in films such as: A Prize of Arms (1962), The Ipcress File (1965), 10 Rillington Place (1971), Labyrinth (1986) and Robin Hood: Prince of Thieves (1991).

TV and film credits

References

External links

1924 births
2009 deaths
20th-century English male actors
English male film actors
English male television actors
Male actors from Gloucestershire
People from Gloucester
People from Victoria, London